Gryf (Polish for "Griffin"), also known as Jaxa, is a Polish coat of arms that was used by many noble families in medieval Poland and later under the Polish–Lithuanian Commonwealth, branches of the original medieval Gryfita-Świebodzic family as well as families connected with the Clan by adoption at ennoblement or even by error.

History

Legend
Leszek III, legendary Prince of Poland, 805?, had 14 sons, of whom the oldest was Popiel I his successor to the throne. Leszek assured special parts of the realm to the remaining sons within his lifetime, obligating them by oath not to make the sovereignty of Popiel contentious. This ensured the safety and liberty of the country with a united army.   
The other sons:
 Barnim and Bogdal kept the principality of Pomerania.
Kazimierz and Władysław, the principality of Kashubia
Vratislav, the island Rügen, with Przybysław.
Cieszymierz and Otto, the Lusatia (Łużyce),
Ziemowit and Zemornyst, the land of Brandenburg (Brenna & Stodorania).
Jaxa with another brother, the Meissen county (Miśnia), in Lusatia (Łużyce)

All these sons united under one war flag given by Leszek. The Lechites originally had a young lion on its war flag, then around 550, the white eagle appeared as a realm flag. The combination of both animal pictures into one figure has developed. Hence a lion's body and an eagle's head, which appears on and above the Gryf shield.

Blazon

Notable bearers
Notable bearers of this coat of arms have included:

Gryfici (Świebodzice)
Jaksa Gryfita
Andrzej Gryfita
House of Branicki
 Jan Klemens Branicki
 Jan Klemens Branicki, Marshall of the Crown Tribunal
 Stefan Mikołaj Branicki, Voivode of Podlasie
 Grzegorz Branicki
 Anna Branicka
 House of Mielecki
 Mikołaj Mielecki
 Zofia Mielecka
Kazimierz Małachowski
 Janisław I Ossowski, Archbishop of Gniezno and Primate of Poland
 Józef Leśniewski, general
 Abraham z Jaxów Chamiec, first known owner of Międzyrzec Podlaski
 Bogdan Jaksa-Ronikier, writer and publicist
 Aleksander Krzysztof Chodkiewicz, Bishop of Kieś and Canon of Wilno
 Zygmunt Rożen, knight
 Mateusz Michał Bąkowski, Stolnik of Halicz
 Szymon Konarski, heraldist
 House of Otwinowski
 Erazm Otwinowski poet and Socinian activist
 Franciszek Jaxa Otwinowski, member of the Sejm 
 August Otwinowski, Burgrave of Kraków

Individual grants based on Gryf

Gallery

Related coat of arms
 Chodkiewicz Coat of Arms
 Coat of arms of Latvia

See also
 Polish heraldry
 Heraldic family
 List of Polish nobility coats of arms 
 House of Griffins
 House of Sobiesław

Bibliography
 Tadeusz Gajl: Herbarz polski od średniowiecza do XX wieku : ponad 4500 herbów szlacheckich 37 tysięcy nazwisk 55 tysięcy rodów. L&L, 2007. .
 Jan Długosz: Jana Długosza kanonika krakowskiego Dziejów polskich ksiąg dwanaście, ks. IX. Kraków: 1867-1870, s. 264.

References

Gryf